Panagiotis Georgeas (born 21 August 2003) is a Greek professional footballer who plays as a winger for Super League 2 club AEK Athens B.

Personal life
Georgeas is the son of former professional footballer Nikolaos.

References

2003 births
Living people
Greek footballers
Super League Greece 2 players
AEK Athens F.C. players
Association football forwards
AEK Athens F.C. B players